Timothy Alwin Hotte (born 4 October 1963) is an English former footballer who played in the Football League for Huddersfield Town, Halifax Town, Hull City and York City.

References
99 Years & Counting – Stats & Stories – Huddersfield Town History

1963 births
Living people
Footballers from Bradford
Association football forwards
English footballers
Arsenal F.C. players
Huddersfield Town A.F.C. players
Harrogate Town A.F.C. players
Halifax Town A.F.C. players
North Ferriby United A.F.C. players
Hull City A.F.C. players
York City F.C. players
English Football League players
English football managers